The 29th American Society of Cinematographers Awards were held on February 15, 2015, at the Hollywood & Highland Ray Dolby Ballroom, honoring the best cinematographers of film and television in 2014.

The film nominees were announced on January 7, 2015. Roger Deakins received a record thirteenth nomination for Unbroken. Óscar Faura and Robert Yeoman are first-time nominees, while veterans Emmanuel Lubezki and Dick Pope also received nominations.

Winners and nominees

Board of Directors Award
 Awarded to actress and singer Barbra Streisand.

Film

Outstanding Achievement in Cinematography in Theatrical Release
 Emmanuel Lubezki, ASC, AMC – Birdman
 Roger Deakins, ASC, BSC – Unbroken
 Óscar Faura – The Imitation Game
 Dick Pope, BSC – Mr. Turner
 Robert Yeoman, ASC – The Grand Budapest Hotel

Spotlight Award
The Spotlight Award nominees were announced on January 16, 2014. The award "recognize[s] outstanding cinematography in features and documentaries that are typically screened at film festivals, in limited theatrical release, or outside the United States".

 Peter Flinckenberg, FSC – Concrete Night (Betoniyö)
 Darius Khondji, ASC, AFC – The Immigrant
 Daniel Landin, BSC – Under the Skin

Television
The previous "One-Hour" and "Half-Hour" categories have been merged into one:

Outstanding Achievement in Cinematography in Episode of a Regular Series
 Jonathan Freeman, ASC – Boardwalk Empire (Episode: "Golden Days for Boys and Girls") (HBO)
 P.J. Dillon – Vikings (Episode: "Blood Eagle") (History)
 Anette Haellmigk – Game of Thrones (Episode: "The Children") (HBO)
 Christopher Norr – Gotham (Episode: "Spirit of the Goat") (Fox)
 Richard Rutkowski – Manhattan (Episode: "Perestroika") (WGN America)
 Fabian Wagner, BSC – Game of Thrones (Episode: "Mockingbird") (HBO)

Outstanding Achievement in Cinematography in Television Movie, Miniseries, or Pilot
 John Lindley, ASC – Manhattan (Episode: "You Always Hurt the One You Love") (WGN America)
 David Greene, CSC – The Trip to Bountiful (Lifetime)
 David Stockton, ASC – Gotham (Episode: "Pilot") (Fox)
 Theo van de Sande, ASC – Deliverance Creek (Lifetime)

Other awards
 ASC International Award: Phil Méheux
 Bud Stone Award of Distinction: Denny Clairmont and Otto Nemenz
 Career Achievement in Television: Bill Roe
 Lifetime Achievement Award: John Bailey
 Presidents Award: Matthew F. Leonetti

References

2014
2014 film awards
2014 television awards
American
2014 in American cinema